U.S. Route 78 (US 78) is an east–west United States highway that runs for 715 miles (1,151 km) from Memphis, Tennessee, to Charleston, South Carolina. From Byhalia, Mississippi to Birmingham, Alabama, US 78 is concurrent with Interstate 22. The highway's western terminus is at U.S. Route 64/U.S. Route 70/U.S. Route 79 (Second Street) in Memphis, Tennessee, and its eastern terminus is on Line Street, in Charleston, South Carolina. One of its related routes, US 278, is actually longer in length than US 78.

Route description

|-
!TN
|
|-
!MS
|
|-
!AL
|
|-
!GA
|
|-
!SC
|
|-class=sortbottom style="border-top: 2px solid #a2a9b1;"
!Total
|
|}

Tennessee

US 78 runs along Linden Avenue, Somerville Street, E. H. Crump Boulevard, and Lamar Avenue through Memphis, Tennessee. In Tennessee, US 78 is historically known as Pigeon Roost Road, and some aborted sections of the highway in Mississippi also claim that name as well as Lamar Avenue. Throughout the Tennessee portion, US 78 is overlapped in its entirety by State Route 278 (SR 278), along Linden Avenue and Somerville Street, and State Route 4 (SR 4) along E. H. Crump Boulevard and Lamar Avenue.

Mississippi
 
US 78 is a freeway for its entire length in Mississippi. The section from its intersection with Interstate 269 in Byhalia, Mississippi to the Alabama state line is concurrent with Interstate 22. The highway runs across the northeastern rural part of the state, connecting several population centers. Mississippi's portion of US 78 is defined in Mississippi Code Annotated § 65-3-3. The old routing of US 78 through the state is signed as MS 178.

Alabama

US 78 is a major east–west U.S. highway across the central part of Alabama. It is internally designated State Route 4 (SR 4) by the Alabama Department of Transportation, though the only section of State Route 4 that is signed is along portions mainly west of Jasper. The section from the Mississippi state line to near Graysville is concurrent with Interstate 22; from Graysville south to Birmingham, US 78 takes its original routing. East of Birmingham to the Georgia state line, US 78 has been replaced as a major through-route by Interstate 20. The two routes roughly parallel each other, with junctions at Leeds and Pell City.

West of Jasper, old US 78 is signed as AL 118 to Guin, and the segment from Guin northward to I-22 at Hamilton is signed as US 43/US 278.

Georgia

US 78 enters Georgia in Haralson County, and then proceeds through Carroll County and Douglas County.  In Douglasville, located in Douglas County, US 78 runs through the downtown, historical part of the city.  It is the original thoroughfare for these Georgia counties.

The route then continues eastward through Cobb and Fulton counties into Atlanta. After crossing Peachtree Street, where US 78 marks a boundary between downtown and Midtown, US 78 is largely conterminous with Ponce de Leon Avenue. As it proceeds due east, this section of the route passes Ponce City Market and crosses the Eastside Trail of the BeltLine before skirting a number of Frederick Law Olmsted-designed parks in the Druid Hills Historic District at the eastern edge of the city. 

After entering Decatur in DeKalb County, US 78 departs from Ponce de Leon Avenue to head northeast. South of the site of North DeKalb Mall, another short freeway portion begins — leading from just inside the eastern rim of Interstate 285 (the Perimeter) to the suburbs of Clarkston, Tucker, Stone Mountain, and Snellville.  This portion is named the Stone Mountain Freeway, and provides an excellent view of Stone Mountain for eastbound motorists.

The route then proceeds east across Gwinnett, Walton, and Oconee counties.  In Oconee County, US 78 leaves Moina Michael Highway at the SR 316 interchange, turning right and running concurrent with SR 316/US 29. (From this point, Moina Michael Highway is signed as US 78 Business, which follows the original route of US 78 through Athens, Ga.)  At the terminal eastern interchange of SR 316 both US 78 and US 29 turn right and join with SR 10 Loop, a mostly interstate-grade bypass that rings Athens-Clarke County.  US 78 exits the bypass and turns right at the Lexington Road interchange.  From there US 78 passes through Oglethorpe, Wilkes, McDuffie and Columbia Counties into Augusta and then onto one of the twin bridges across the Savannah River into South Carolina.

South Carolina

US 78 provides the most direct route between Augusta and Charleston, through the South Carolina Lowcountry.  Crossing Savannah River into the state, it goes northeast into Aiken before going southeasterly through the cities and towns of Williston, Blackville, Denmark, Bamberg, Branchville, and St. George.  East of Dorchester, it parallels Interstate 26 into downtown Charleston, where it ends.

History

In western Alabama, the historical name of US 78 is Bankhead Highway. It is also known by this name in portions of Georgia, including Atlanta, and the Bankhead neighborhood takes its name from that stretch of road. Also, the old section of US 78 (now MS 178) that travels through downtown New Albany, Mississippi, is named Bankhead Street.

Throughout the 2000s, US 78 has been gradually upgraded into a four-lane freeway in Mississippi and Alabama and signed as Interstate 22. US 78 is completely concurrent with I-22 from Byhalia, Mississippi to Birmingham, Alabama.

Future

After the completion of Interstate 22 throughout the 2010s, it is uncertain whether US 78 will be decommissioned west of Birmingham or the old route recommissioned as US 78 upon completion of Interstate 22. If the old route is recommissioned as US 78, parts of I-22 and US 78 would be forced to overlap. A stretch from just west of Hamilton, Alabama to the first exit in Mississippi, as well as a stretch from MS 25 in Fulton, Mississippi to the next exit west of Fulton after crossing the Tennessee-Tombigbee waterway will overlap.  The Hamilton area overlap would be due to the old US 78 routing no longer exists west of Hamilton having been upgraded to I-22 from Weston westward into Mississippi.  The second overlap would be necessary because the old US 78 no longer exists west of downtown Fulton, Mississippi due to the Tennessee-Tombigbee waterway and no bridge in place to carry US 78 traffic on the former route.

Major intersections
Tennessee
  in Memphis
  in Memphis
  in Memphis
  in Memphis
Mississippi
  west-northwest of Byhalia. Begin I-22 Concurrency.
  in Tupelo
Alabama
  in Hamilton
  near Adamsville
  near Birmingham. End I-22 Concurrency.
  in Birmingham
  in Birmingham. The highways travel concurrently through Birmingham.
  in Birmingham
  in Leeds
  in Leeds
  northwest of Chulavista. The highways travel concurrently to Pell City.
  in Pell City
  in Riverside
  in Oxford.
Georgia
  in Bremen
  in Lithia Springs. The highways travel concurrently to Druid Hills.
  in Atlanta
  in Atlanta. The highways travel concurrently through Atlanta.
  in Atlanta. US 29/US 78 travels concurrently to the Scottdale–North Decatur city line.
  in Atlanta. The highways travel concurrently to Decatur.
  on the Scottdale–Clarkston city line
  southeast of Bogart. The highways travel concurrently to Athens.
  in Athens. The highways travel concurrently through Athens.
  in Washington
  north of Thomson
  southeast of Thomson. The highways travel concurrently to Clearwater, South Carolina.
  in Harlem
  in Augusta
  in Augusta. The highways travel concurrently to Aiken, South Carolina.
  in Augusta. The highways travel concurrently to North Augusta, South Carolina.
South Carolina
  in North Augusta
  in Denmark
  in Bamberg
  in Branchville. The highways travel concurrently through Branchville.
  in St. George
  in St. George
  east of Dorchester
  in North Charleston
  in North Charleston. The highways travel concurrently through North Charleston.
  in North Charleston
  in North Charleston
 King Street/Line Street in Charleston

See also

Special routes of U.S. Route 78

Related U.S. Routes
 U.S. Route 178
 U.S. Route 278
 U.S. Route 378

References

External links

Evermore Community Improvement District
High Priority Corridors @ aaroads.com
Highway 78 CID
Highway 78 on OpenStreetMap.org 
 Endpoints of U.S. Highway 78

 
United States Numbered Highway System
U.S. Highways in Tennessee
U.S. Highways in Mississippi
U.S. Highways in Alabama
Roads with a reversible lane